Lupeni (Hungarian pronunciation: , meaning "Wolf's Home") is a commune in Harghita County, Transylvania, Romania. It lies in the Székely Land, an ethno-cultural region in eastern Transylvania.

Geography
Lupeni is situated on the Feernicul stream, 13 km northwest of Odorheiu Secuiesc on the road to Corund and Sovata. The usually small Fehér Nyikó stream became so swollen in the catastrophic floods of 2005 when 11 centimeters (4.3 inches) of rain fell in the space of two hours, that three people lost their lives when they were swept away as the water rose over four meters.

Component villages
The commune is composed of nine villages:

History

The commune was historically part of the Székely seat of Udvarhelyszék until 1876. After the administrative reform in the Kingdom of Hungary it became a part of the Udvarhely County until 1918. In 1920, the villages, like the rest of Transylvania, formally passed with the Treaty of Trianon from Hungarian to Romanian control. The commune was temporarily incorporated into Hungary, between 1940 and 1944, along with Northern Transylvania under the Second Vienna Award. Between 1952 and 1960, it formed part of the Hungarian Autonomous Province, then, of the Mureș-Hungarian Autonomous Province until it was abolished in 1968. Since then, the commune has been part of Harghita County.

Demographics
The commune has an absolute Székely (Hungarian) majority. According to the 2002 census it has a population of 4,434 of which 99.28% or 4,402 are Hungarian. In 2004, half of the population of the village was engaged in charcoal burning as their principal business.

Notable people
Lupeni is the birthplace of the famous Hungarian writer Áron Tamási (1897–1966), known for such works as Címeresek and the Ábel trilogy.

Landmarks

 The Roman Catholic church was built between 1842 and 1848 in classicist style in the honour of Saint John of Nepomuk
 The grave of Áron Tamási (1897–1966), Székely writer, can be seen between two Turkey oaks behind the church, his memorial is the work of Jenő Szervátiusz and Tibor Szervátiusz. Today, his birthhouse is open to the public as a museum.

Twinnings
The commune is twinned with:
  Ajak, Hungary
  Lengyeltóti, Hungary
  Kemence, Hungary

Gallery

References

Communes in Harghita County
Székely communities
Localities in Transylvania